The Planet Ice Skating and Hockey Arena or Planet Ice is a multi-purpose ice arena and recreational facility located in Lafayette, Louisiana.

Hockey
It is the home game and practice rink for the college LSU Tigers men's hockey team of the South Eastern Collegiate Hockey Conference (SECHC) and the Louisiana Ragin' Cajuns men's hockey team.

Since 2015, the facility has also been the home venue for the Louisiana Drillers of the North American 3 Hockey League (NA3HL).

Lock-In
Planet Ice offers many “Lock-In” events that last from 7PM one day to 7AM next. For 12 hours, many activities are going on. This includes karaoke, dance-offs, and sports. The Lock-In's are priced at $25.

References

Indoor ice hockey venues in Louisiana
Sports venues in Lafayette, Louisiana
LSU Tigers and Lady Tigers sports venues
Louisiana Ragin' Cajuns
Sports venues completed in 2011
2011 establishments in Louisiana